Motel is a Mexican rock band created in 2002, consisting of Guillermo "Billy" Méndez and Rodrigo Dávila Chapoy.

History
Motel was formed when its original members — Rodrigo and Billy — reunited to perform music casually, without long-term career intentions. Both recorded songs in music studios and rehearsals independently for several months before coming together as a group. They then played as a duo in bars in Mexico City, eventually inviting Michel DeQuevedo (drums) and Rubén Puente (bass) to form part of the band. Michel DeQuevedo was later replaced by José Damián (drums)

In March 2006, they released their debut album, Motel, and single, "Dime Ven", both produced by Aureo Baqueiro and co-produced by Jay de la Cueva under the Warner Music label. "Dime Ven" peaked at second place in the Mexican Hot 100 in July 2006, coming just short of Julieta Venegas's "Me Voy". Motel followed with a second single, "Olvídame". The same year, Motel wrote Skimo es el Lugar for the television sitcom Skimo, broadcast by Nickelodeon Latinamerica.

By March 2007, Motel announced through their website the upcoming release of their second album, 17, which was released on 20 November 2007. 17 first single, "Y Te Vas", was released in anticipation in October and listed as a weekly free download on iTunes. "17" was released on 29 January in the United States, after the band had promoted in the U.S. Later, the band released three more singles: "Uno, Dos, Tres", "Dos Palabras" featuring Lu's lead singer, Paty Cantú, and "Ahí vienes". The band also promised to hold a concert soon for those under 18, since their last two concerts were exclusively for adults.

Discography

Albums
 2006: Motel
 2007: 17
 2010: Multicolor
 2013: Prisma

Live albums
 2008: Live Sessions (iTunes Exclusive)

Singles

As featured artist

References

Mexican rock music groups
Rock en Español music groups